Dick Richards was a journalist who covered entertainment and showbusiness matters, sometimes in a Sunday Pictorial column called 'The Bright Lights'.

He appeared as a castaway on the BBC Radio programme Desert Island Discs on 8 March 1965.

In 2012 a collection of photographs was found in a house clearance, showing Richards in the company of stars such as Charlie Chaplin, Burt Lancaster, Marilyn Monroe, Ginger Rogers, Frank Sinatra, and David Niven.

Bibliography 

 
  (as editor)

References 

Year of birth missing
Place of birth missing
Year of death missing
Place of death missing
British male journalists